Gatlinburg-Pittman High School is a public high school located in Gatlinburg, Tennessee, USA.  Current enrollment is estimated at 628 students in grades 9 to 12.  It serves Gatlinburg, the neighboring town of Pittman Center and a portion of the community of Cosby, and is a part of the Sevier County school system.

References 

Public high schools in Tennessee
Schools in Sevier County, Tennessee
Gatlinburg, Tennessee